Thamir bin Abdulaziz Al Saud (1937 27 June 1958) was a member of the House of Saud. He died young and therefore, held no important cabinet position.

Biography
Prince Thamir was born in 1937. He was the son of King Abdulaziz and Nouf bint Nawaf bin Nuri Al Shaalan. They married in November 1935. She was from the Ruwala tribe based in the northwestern Saudi Arabia, Transjordan and Syria. Prince Thamir had two full brothers; Prince Mamdouh and Prince Mashhur. Prince Thamir committed suicide in 1958.

Prince Thamir had a son, Faisal, who was among the members of the Allegiance Commission. Faisal bin Thamir's ex-wife is Seeta bint Abdullah, a daughter of former ruler of Saudi Arabia, King Abdullah.

Ancestry

References

Thamir
1937 births
1958 suicides
Thamir
Suicides in California